Daniel Sarrabat (1666–1748) was a French painter.

Biography

The son of a family of artists and scholars, Daniel Sarrabat was baptized in Charenton on October 10, 1666. His brother, became a popular engraver.

Winner of the Prix de Rome in 1688, he spent the next two years studying at the French Academy in Rome. In 1690, he won first prize in Rome for his painting "Noah and his family out of the ark."

Returning to Lyon, he was the father of mathematician Nicolas Sarrabat.

He died in Lyon on June 21, 1748.

References

1666 births
1748 deaths
17th-century French painters
French male painters
18th-century French painters
Prix de Rome for painting
18th-century French male artists

ga:Daniel Sarrabat